James Howard, 3rd Earl of Suffolk, KB (10 February 1606/16077 January 1688), and 3rd Baron Howard de Walden (1619–1688), eldest son of Theophilus Howard, 2nd Earl of Suffolk. Howard was honoured with knighthood in the Order of the Bath in 1626, and was a joint-commissioner of the parliament to Charles I the same year. He supported the Royalist cause in the English Civil War, and was a courtier after the Restoration of the monarchy in 1660. He was lord-lieutenant of Suffolk and Cambridgeshire and gentleman of the bedchamber, 1660–1682.

Biography
At the coronation of Charles I on 2 February 1626 Howard was created K.B., and in February 1639, as Lord Walden, became leader of a troop of volunteer horse for the king's army. 

On 3 June 1640 Howard succeeded his father, Theophilus as the 3rd Earl of Suffolk, and on the 16th of the same month was sworn joint lord-lieutenant of Suffolk. The parliament nominated him lord-lieutenant of that county on 28 February 1642. On 28 December 1643 he received a summons to attend the king's Parliament at Oxford, and on 7 July 1646 was appointed joint commissioner from the parliament to the king at Newcastle.

Acting on a report from the Committee of Safety, in September 1647, the commons decided, but went no further, to impeach Howard, together with six other peers, of high treason. On 8 September 1653 Howard was sworn as high steward of Ipswich. 

After the Restoration Howard became lord-lieutenant of Suffolk, and of Cambridgeshire on 25 July 1660. From 18 to 24 April 1661 he acted as Earl Marshal of England for the coronation of Charles II. In the same year he became colonel of the Suffolk regiment of horse militia. On 28 September 1663 he was created M.A. of Oxford, and M.A. of Cambridge on 6 September 1664. He was also appointed governor of Landguard Fort, Essex, gentleman of the bedchamber to the king on 4 March 1665, keeper of the king's house at Audley End, Essex, in March 1667, joint commissioner for the office of earl-marshal of England on 15 June 1673, colonel commandant of three regiments of Cambridgeshire militia in 1678, and was hereditary visitor of Magdalene College, Cambridge. In March 1681 he was discharged from the lord-lieutenancy of Suffolk and Cambridgeshire, and from attendance in the king's bedchamber

Howard died in December 1688, and was buried on 16 January 1689 at Saffron Walden, Essex. On his death the earldom passed to his brother |George (died 1691). The barony Howard de Walden fell into abeyance for nearly a century, until it was called out of abeyance for a descendant of his elder daughter Lady Essex Howard, later Baroness Griffin.

Family
On 1 December 1640 (later in the same year that he became 3rd Earl of Suffolk) Howard married Lady Susan Rich (died 15 May 1649), daughter of Henry, 1st of Holland, and with her had a daughter Essex. 

In about February 1650, Howard married for a second time, Barbara (died 13 December 1681), daughter of Sir Edward Villiers, and widow of Richard Wenman and latterly Sir Richard Wentworth. The second Lady Suffolk died on 13 December 1681, leaving a mutual daughter, his second child, Lady Elizabeth Howard, groom of the stool to the queen. 

After December 1681 and before 8 May 1682 Lord Suffolk married Anne (died October 1720), eldest daughter of Robert Montagu, 3rd Earl of Manchester with whom he had no children.

Land and buildings
Lord Suffolk owned central London property including Suffolk House and appears to have left his Jacobean house, Audley End, Essex, built by the 1st Earl, to the descendants of his elder daughter.

Notes

References
.

|-

|-

|-

1619 births
1688 deaths
Earls Marshal
James
03
James Howard, 03rd Earl of Suffolk
Lord-Lieutenants of Cambridgeshire
Lord-Lieutenants of Suffolk